Us Moderates is a centrist electoral alliance and parliamentary group that ran within the centre-right coalition in the 2022 Italian general election. After the election, Us Moderates formed a parliamentary groups both in the Chamber of Deputies and the Senate, thanks to the influx of some elects from the Brothers of Italy and the alliance with the Associative Movement of Italians Abroad (MAIE).

Composition

Founding members

Associate members

Regional partners

Electoral results

Italian Parliament

References

2022 establishments in Italy
Political parties established in 2022
Catholic political parties
Centrist parties in Italy
Christian democratic parties in Italy
Political party alliances in Italy